Escape to the Wild is a British television series produced by Optomen television and broadcast on Channel 4. It was originally titled, Kevin McCloud's Escape to the Wild, with Kevin McCloud as the presenter who follows British families who have given up their urban lives in the UK for a new one in remote destinations around the world. With McCloud's departure, the name has been shortened to Escape to the Wild.

Kevin McCloud's Escape to the Wild - Episodes

Escape to the Wild - Episodes

References

External links
 
 Channel4's Escape to the Wild

2015 British television series debuts
2015 British television series endings
British television documentaries
Channel 4 original programming
Television series by All3Media
Television series by Optomen
English-language television shows